Aicone  (died 918) was an archbishop of the archdiocese of Milan.

Life 
Aicone is referred to as a strong supporter of Berengario I.

He died in Milan on 7 September 918.

References 

Archbishops of Milan
9th-century births

918 deaths
Year of birth unknown